Bhakri is a round flatbread (roti) often used in the cuisine of the states of Gujarat, Maharashtra, Rajasthan, and Karnataka in India. The bhakri prepared using jowar or bajra is coarser than a regular wheat chapati.
Bhakri can be either soft or hard in texture, unlike khakhra in respect to hardness.

Grains and variants
Different types of millets (jowar, bajra, ragi) are the more common grains used for making bhakris. These millet bhakris are popular in the Deccan plateau regions of India (Maharashtra and Northern Karnataka) as well as the semi-arid regions of Rajasthan.
 In the coastal Konkan and Goa regions of western India rice flour is used for making bhakri.
 Jowar bhakri - Jowar bhakris are the most common type of bhakri. The dough is prepared by mixing jowar flour with hot water and then flattened by hand.
 Bajra bhakri - Bajra bhakris are mainly prepared in winter, especially near the festival of Sankranti. The preparation is similar to jowar bhakris. 
 Makai bhakri- Cornmeal bhakris commonly prepared during winters. Also known by the name "Makai No Rotlo" in Gujarati & "Makyachi Bhakri" in Marathi. 
 Ragi bhakri - Ragi bhakhris, or ragi rottis, are made of red finger millets. They are prepared similar to other bhakris.
 Rice bhakri - Rice bhakhris are made of rice flour, prepared similarly to other bhakris. They are common in the Konkan region.
 Wheat Bhakri - Wheat bhakris are like wheat rotis, but bigger in size and depth with proportionally more oil.
 Pulse Bhakri - Prepared from urad dal or mix flour of urad and jowar, also known as Kalna bhakri. They are very popular in Khandesh region.

The dough for bhakri prepared by mixing the flour with small amount of salt in a bowl and knead into a smooth stiff dough, using enough hot water
The dough is split into little balls. The ball is then flattened using one's palms. There are 2 types by which is made. It is either flattened in the plate by palm by pressing or it is made thin by holding the ball in both palms which requires a lot of skill. The tava (pan) is heated and the bhakri is cooked applying little water to the upper surface and spread it all over with the help of the cook's fingers. The other side also cooked on the tava. ।
Once it is prepared, it is roasted in the direct flame on both the sides.
A bhakri an be of two types soft or hard. the hard bhakri is basically with hard outer layers to ad a crunch re

Serving
Bhakri is typically served with yogurt, garlic chutney, Pithla, baingan bharta, thecha (chutney made of green chillies and peanuts), preparations of green leafy vegetables and raw onion. In northern parts of Karnataka, it is served with stuffed brinjal curry. In Vidarbha, it is eaten with "Zunka"- A coarse and thick variant of "Pithla." It has traditionally been the rural staple which would be carried to the farm at the crack of dawn and make up for both breakfast and lunch. In the fields, bhakri even used to serve as a plate, on which chutney, kharda or thecha was served and eaten together. In Khandesh region, bhakri and shev bhaji (thick savory curry prepared from sev) is a very popular dish. In the coastal regions like Konkan and Goa, the rice flour bhakris are mainly served with fish curry.

In modern days, bhakhris have increasingly been replaced by wheat rotis and phulkas but they still retain popularity in many regions and as specialty dishes.

See also
Roti
Chapati
Paratha
Kulcha
 List of Indian breads

References

External links
 Gujarati Bhakri Recipe
 Step by Step Bajra Bhakri Recipe 

Gujarati cuisine
Indian breads
Flatbreads
Unleavened breads
Rajasthani cuisine
Maharashtrian cuisine
Roti
Flatbread dishes